Children of Steel may refer to:

 Children of Steel (audio play), a Sarah Jane Adventures audio story
 Children of Steel (album),a 1994 album by Edguy